In mathematical set theory, a set of Gödel operations is a finite collection of operations on sets that can be used to construct the constructible sets from ordinals.  introduced the original set of 8 Gödel operations 𝔉1,...,𝔉8 under the name fundamental operations. Other authors sometimes use a slightly different set of about 8 to 10 operations, usually denoted G1, G2,...

Definition

 used the following eight operations as a set of Gödel operations (which he called fundamental operations):

  

The second expression in each line gives Gödel's definition in his original notation, where the dot means intersection, V is the universe, E is the membership relation, and so on.

 uses the following set of 10 Gödel operations.

Properties

Gödel's normal form theorem states that if φ(x1,...xn) is a formula in the language of set theory with all quantifiers bounded, then the function {(x1,...,xn) ∈ X1×...×Xn | φ(x1, ..., xn)) of X1, ..., Xn is given by a composition of some Gödel operations. This result is closely related to Jensen's rudimentary functions.

References

Inline references

Constructible universe